The World Day of Peace is an annual celebration by the Catholic Church, dedicated to universal peace, held on 1 January, the Solemnity of Mary, Mother of God. Pope Paul VI established it in 1967, being inspired by the encyclical Pacem in Terris of Pope John XXIII and with reference to his own encyclical Populorum Progressio. The day was first observed on 1 January 1968.

World Day of Peace often has been an occasion on which the Popes made magisterial declarations of social doctrine. Pope Paul VI and Pope John Paul II made important declarations on the Day in each year of their pontificates regarding the United Nations, human rights, women's rights, labor unions, economic development, the right to life, international diplomacy, peace in the Holy Land (Israel), globalization, and terrorism.

In England and Wales, "Peace Sunday" is traditionally observed on the Second Sunday of Ordinary Time, which is the Sunday occurring between 14 and 20 January, inclusive. The British branch of the Pax Christi movement prepares suggested material for it annually.

References

External links

 Index of Papal Messages for World Day of Peace Since 2006
 US Catholic Bishops' Resources for World Day of Peace
 Pax Christi UK Resources for Peace Sunday
 Scottish Catholic Justice and Peace

Religion and peace
Catholic holy days
January observances
Christmastide